Gregory Campbell or Greg Campbell may refer to:

 Gregory Campbell (politician) (born 1953), Northern Ireland politician
 Gregory Campbell (ice hockey) (born 1983), Canadian ice hockey player
 Greg Campbell (cricketer) (born 1964), Australian cricketer
 Greg Campbell (author) (born 1970), American non-fiction author
 Greg Campbell (footballer) (born 1965), English former footballer